Voralaksanavadi (12 June 1872 – 18 August 1926), was the Princess of Siam (later Thailand). She was a member of Siamese Royal Family. She is a daughter of Chulalongkorn, King Rama V of Siam.

Her mother was The Noble Consort (Chao Chom Manda) Sud Sukumolchan (daughter of Phraya Surindorn Rajseni and Khunying Klin). She died on 18 August 1926, at the age of 54 years 10 months.

Royal Decoration
  Dame Cross of the Most Illustrious Order of Chula Chom Klao (First class): received 12 November 1911.

Ancestry

1872 births
1926 deaths
19th-century Thai women
19th-century Chakri dynasty
20th-century Thai women
20th-century Chakri dynasty
Thai female Phra Ong Chao
Dames Grand Cross of the Order of Chula Chom Klao
Children of Chulalongkorn
Daughters of kings